Avalon Theater or Theatre may refer to:

Australia
 Avalon Theatre, Hobart, Tasmania

United States
 Avalon Theater (Catalina), California; now known as Catalina Casino
 Avalon Theatre, Easton, Maryland
 Avalon Theater (Brooklyn), New York
 Avalon Theater (Larimore, North Dakota), listed on the National Register of Historic Places
 Avalon Theatre (Portland, Oregon), a movie theatre
 Avalon Theatre (Washington, D.C.), listed on the National Register of Historic Places

Buildings and structures disambiguation pages